Kahani Terrii Merrii is an television series produced by Ekta Kapoor (Balaji Telefilms), broadcast on Sony Entertainment Television (India) in 2003. Nivedita Basu was the creative head of the show and it was directed by Garry Bhinder.

The story is a family drama that revolving around a business family in Kolkata, Chakravartys. The opening title song was sung by Sonu Nigam and Priya Bhattacharya, with choreography by Saroj Khan.

Plot 
Kahani Terrii Merrii is the story of a joint Bengali family. The male protagonist of the show Dhruv and his childhood friend Tara fall in love in adulthood and get married. However, having suffered through loneliness in his childhood after his father left his mother for another woman, Dhruv has grown up to be an alcoholic. Despite Tara's love and support, he is unable to give up his addiction.

Some of his family members want to separate Dhruv and Tara, especially Dhruv's sister-in-law. Gradually, Tara helps Dhruv get control of his life and become a better person. When Tara's friend and businesswoman Rajita (Poonam Narula) enters their lives, Dhruv clashes with her but soon they begin an affair and fall in love.

Dhruv doesn't realize that he commits the same mistake as his father by falling for another woman and ruining his marital life. Tara discovers their illegitimate relationship and confronts Dhruv who finally realizes his mistake. But Tara does not forgive him. When Dhruv's mother becomes aware of her son's actions, she sympathises with Tara who is in the same situation that she was many years ago. She supports Tara's decision to leave Dhruv and encourages her to move on from him. The show ends with Tara leaving Dhruv while he repents his actions.

Cast 
 Manav Gohil as Dhruv
 Tina Parekh as Tara
 Poonam Narula as Rajita
 Sai Ballal
 Shama Deshpande
 Urvashi Dholakia as Kajol
 Milind Gawali
 Kavita Kaushik
 Hrishikesh Pandey
 Sikandar Kharbanda

Reception  
Kahani Terrii Merrii was launched with much promise. The show replaced the hit drama Kutumb and was touted to be one of the expensive television shows of that time. The show was loosely inspired by the grandeur of Devdas. Despite the lavish sets and a huge cast, the show failed to impress the audiences and critics alike. The reception of the show was poor all over and ratings were dismal. The show thus ended abruptly. It was replaced by the critically acclaimed Naam Gumm Jayega.

References

External links
 
 

Balaji Telefilms television series
2000s Indian television series
Sony Entertainment Television original programming